An amphibious transport dock, also called a landing platform dock (LPD), is an amphibious warfare ship, a warship that embarks, transports, and lands elements of a landing force for expeditionary warfare missions. Several navies currently operate this kind of ship. The ships are generally designed to transport troops into a war zone by sea, primarily using landing craft, although invariably they also have the capability to operate transport helicopters.

Amphibious transport docks perform the mission of amphibious transports, amphibious cargo ships, and the older dock landing ships (LSD) by incorporating both a flight deck and a well deck that can be ballasted and deballasted to support landing craft or amphibious vehicles. The main difference between LSDs and LPDs is that while both have helicopter landing decks, the LPD also has hangar facilities for protection and maintenance. In the United States Navy, the newer class of LPD has succeeded the older classes of LSDs, and both the Navy and United States Marine Corps are looking to the LPD to be the basis of their new LX(R) program to replace their LSDs.

LPD classes

Decommissioned

Gallery

See also
 Amphibious warfare ship
 Dock landing ship
 Landing Platform Helicopter
 List of amphibious warfare ships
 List of United States Navy amphibious warfare ships § Landing Platform Dock (LPD)

References 

Ship types
Amphibious warfare vessels